A porch is an architectural element of building entrances.

Porch may also refer to:
 The Porch or Stoa Poikile (5th century BC), part of the Ancient Agora of Athens, Greece
 Porch (company), an online home-improvement resource platform
 "Porch" (Pearl Jam song), from their 1991 album Ten
 Front porch campaign, a form of home-based political campaigning
 Porch (broadcasting), a video synchronization technique
 Garage (residential) or car porch
 Robert Porch (1875-1962), English cricketer
 Vestibule (architecture), sometimes referred to as a porch

See also 
 Porches (disambiguation)
 Porsche, an automobile company